Gamma-glutamyltransferase 1 (GGT1), also known as CD224 (Cluster of Differentiation 224), is a human gene.

Function 

Human gamma-glutamyltransferase catalyzes the transfer of the glutamyl moiety of glutathione to a variety of amino acids and dipeptide acceptors. This heteroduplex enzyme is composed of a heavy chain and a light chain, which are derived from a single precursor protein, and is present in tissues involved in absorption and secretion. This enzyme is a member of the gamma-glutamyltransferase protein family, of which many members have not yet been fully characterized. This gene encodes several transcript variants; studies suggest that many transcripts of this gene family may be non-functional or represent pseudogenes. The functional transcripts which have been fully characterized have been grouped and classified as type I gamma-glutamyltransferase. Complex splicing events may take place in a tissue-specific manner, resulting in marked dissimilarity in the 5' UTRs. Several 5' UTR transcript variants of the type I gene have been identified in different tissues and cancer cells.

See also 
 Cluster of differentiation

References

Further reading

External links 
 

Clusters of differentiation